Ornithine oxoglutarate (OGO) or ornithine α-ketoglutarate (OKG) is a drug used in liver therapy.  It is the salt formed from ornithine and alpha-ketoglutaric acid.  It is also used to improve nutritional health in elderly patients.

References 

Amino acids
Combination drugs